South Xizang Road is the name of an interchange station between Line 4 and Line 8 of the Shanghai Metro. It began operation on both lines on 29 December 2007. On 22 October 2010 the station handled about 100,000 entries and exits. It is the first station in Huangpu District when travelling northbound on Line 8.

Station Layout

Places nearby
The 9th People's Hospital

References

Railway stations in Shanghai
Shanghai Metro stations in Huangpu District
Line 4, Shanghai Metro
Line 8, Shanghai Metro
Railway stations in China opened in 2007